Hyperolius quadratomaculatus is a species of frog in the family Hyperoliidae.
It is endemic to Mohorro, Tanzania.
Its natural habitats are rivers, freshwater marshes, and intermittent freshwater marshes. It presumably breeds in waterbodies and has a larval development breeding strategy.

References

quadratomaculatus
Amphibians described in 1931
Taxonomy articles created by Polbot